is a 2011 Japanese/Brazilian drama-thriller film directed by Vicente Amorim, based on the book of the same name by Fernando Morais. The film was premiered at Festival do Rio on October 13, 2011, and was released in Brazil on August 17, 2012.

The film is based upon the true story of Shindo Renmei, a terrorist organization composed of Japanese immigrants in Brazil, at the end of World War II.

Plot 
In 1945, news of the Surrender of Japan was received with wide skepticism by most Japanese immigrants in Brazil, who assumed it be mere Allied propaganda. Those who did accept the truth are seen as traitors, "dirty hearts", who dishonor the emperor; patriotic-turned-terrorist organization Shindo Renmei takes in their own hands the duty of killing said traitors.

The movie is told from the point of view of the wife of a Shindo Renmei member, who can't help but witness her husband lose himself in fanaticism and bloodshed.

Cast 
 Tsuyoshi Ihara plays the protagonist Takahashi, a quiet immigrant who becomes a soldier of intolerance.
 Takako Tokiwa plays Miyuki, Takahashi's wife, who struggles with her husband's transformation into a killer.
 Eiji Okuda plays Colonel Watanabe, a former Japanese Imperial Army officer.
 Shun Sugata plays Sasaki, an immigrant who paid dearly for raising his voice against the movement of the Japanese who refuse to accept the defeat of Japan.
 Kimiko Yo plays Naomi, the wife of Sasaki.
 Eduardo Moscovis plays the sheriff and reflects the perplexity with which Brazilians witnessed the fratricidal war among immigrants.
 Celine Miyuki plays Akemi, the daughter of Naomi and Sasaki. It is the vision of the girl on the events, yet devoid of hatred and intolerance, which punctuates the narrative.
 André Frateschi plays Cabo Garcia, the man who served as the flashpoint of the war portrayed in the film. Garcia violates the Japanese flag, and incurs the wrath of immigrants.
 Ken Kaneko: The only immigrant actor in the cast, Ken Kaneko has lived for more than six decades in Brazil, and is the oldest and most well known Japanese actor working in the country. Ken considered his participation in the film, the role of immigrant Matsuda, a prestige for his career.
 Issamu Yazaki: Yazaki is not an immigrant, but lives as if in a uniquely Japanese agricultural colony in São Paulo. He was chosen to play Aoki, one of the few immigrants in the story who recognize the Japanese defeat in World War II. He pays a high price for accepting the truth.

See also
Gaijin - Ama-me Como Sou

References

External links
  
 

2011 thriller drama films
2011 films
Brazilian historical films
Films about immigration
Films based on Brazilian novels
Films shot in Paulínia
2010s Portuguese-language films
2010s Japanese-language films
2011 multilingual films
Brazilian multilingual films
Japanese multilingual films
Japanese-Brazilian culture